Paratylenchus macrophallus is a plant pathogenic nematode infecting mint.

References

External links 
 Nemaplex, University of California - Paratylenchus macrophallus

Tylenchida
Mint diseases
Agricultural pest nematodes